Kyle of Lochalsh railway station is the terminus of the Kyle of Lochalsh Line in the village of Kyle of Lochalsh in the Highlands, northern Scotland. ScotRail, who manage the station, operate all of the services here.

History 

The extension took more than four years to complete due to the unforgiving nature of the terrain through which it was driven - 29 bridges had to be constructed and more than 30 cuttings excavated through solid rock, which led to it costing £20,000 per mile (making it the most expensive rail route to be built in the UK at the time). As built, the station consisted of a broad island platform on a pier next to the water's edge and a chalet-style station building close to the western end. Several sidings were provided, along with a signal box and small locomotive shed. The station was host to two LMS caravans from 1935 to 1937 followed by one caravan in 1938 to 1939.

Originally the station provided a connection to the ferry services for the Outer Hebrides.

The signal box closed in 1984, when Radio Electronic Token Block working was introduced on the line by British Rail - although no longer operational it is still intact and has been adapted for use as a holiday cottage.

The station is located next to the piers that used to offer sailings to Skye, the ferries being superseded on 16 October 1995 by the Skye Bridge that lies close to the station.

Facilities 

The station is well-equipped, with a ticket office, accessible toilets, benches and a telephone. There is a small restaurant/gift shop on the platform. There are car parking places on the access bridge.

Platform layout 
The station has two platforms, which can each accommodate a nine-coach train, though only the western face (platform 1) is normally used by passenger trains. Three sidings are also still intact, including a run-round loop for loco-hauled trains alongside platform 1, and a loading bank siding adjacent to this).  Access to each of the sidings and platform 2 is by means of ground frames. Use of platform 2 is rare, and is only booked to be used by one return train from Inverness on a Sunday.

Passenger volume 

The statistics cover twelve month periods that start in April.

Services 

References

Bibliography

External links 

 Friends Of the Kyle Line
 Video footage of the station and branch in 1970
Kyle of Lochalsh Station in 2018

Railway stations in Highland (council area)
Railway stations serving harbours and ports in the United Kingdom
Railway stations served by ScotRail
Railway stations in Great Britain opened in 1897
Former Highland Railway stations
Listed railway stations in Scotland
Category B listed buildings in Highland (council area)